Humongous Entertainment, Inc. was an American video game developer based in Bothell, Washington. Founded in 1992, the company is best known for developing multiple edutainment franchises, most prominently Putt-Putt, Freddi Fish, Pajama Sam and Spy Fox, which, combined, sold over 15 million copies and earned more than 400 awards of excellence.

Humongous Entertainment was acquired by GT Interactive (later renamed Infogrames, Inc., then Atari, Inc.) in July 1996. By October 2000, sales of Humongous games had surpassed 16 million copies. GT sold Humongous to its parent company, Infogrames (later renamed Atari SA), in August 2005, as a result of which the company was shut down a few months after. Infogrames transitioned the label to a new company, Humongous, Inc., which continued publishing games under the Humongous label until 2013, when it faced bankruptcy. As part of the bankruptcy agreement of the Atari SA subsidiary Atari, Inc., Humongous, Inc. and Atari Interactive, Tommo acquired the Humongous brand and all of its assets, and went on to re-release some of its games into digital distribution channels in conjunction with Night Dive Studios.

History

Formation (1992–1996) 
Humongous Entertainment was formed by Shelley Day and Ron Gilbert in 1992, then based in Woodinville, Washington. The name Humongous Entertainment was suggested by Gilbert's ex-LucasArts colleague, Tim Schafer. It became known for creating four point-and-click adventure game series intended for young children, branded collectively as "Junior Adventures", with the four series being the Putt-Putt series, the Freddi Fish series, the Pajama Sam series and the Spy Fox series. Despite all four series being developed and released in parallel, characters from one series do not cross over with ones in another (except for Putt-Putt and Fatty Bear's Activity Pack, where Putt-Putt and Fatty Bear combined their Fun Packs) and instead appear as cameos or Easter eggs in any of the three other series. The company became the third largest children's educational-software company.

In 1995, Gilbert and Day established a company division, Cavedog Entertainment, in Seattle, set to develop games of alternative genres, and released Total Annihilation, a real-time strategy (RTS) game, in 1997. This was followed by two expansion packs in 1998, as well as a variation called Total Annihilation: Kingdoms plus an expansion pack in 1999.

Acquisitions, decline, dissolution (1996–2006) 
In November 1997, Humongous Entertainment signed a five-year worldwide deal with Nickelodeon to develop games based on the Nick Jr. series, Blue's Clues, making it the first and only time that Humongous has developed games based on a licensed character as opposed to its original characters. The same year, Humongous released their first "Backyard Sports" title, Backyard Baseball. Backyard Sports would go on to become the company's longest-running series. In November 1999, GT Interactive was acquired by Infogrames and renamed to Infogrames, Inc. In 2000, Humongous Entertainment released a One-Stop Fun Shop activity center game for each Junior Adventure series, with the exception of Spy Fox. The co-founders tried to buy Humongous Entertainment back from Infogrames, Inc., using external funding, but the day of the planned purchase was the day of the dot-com collapse, wherefore the funding was pulled. The founders soon left Humongous, alongside many other key employees, and formed a new studio, Hulabee Entertainment, in 2001. In June 2001, Infogrames, Inc. laid off 82 personnel, over 40% of staff from Humongous Entertainment. The final title developed by Humongous was Backyard Skateboarding 2006, released in October 2005. The company was dissolved on April 1, 2006.

Humongous, Inc. (2006–2013) 
Following the closure of the main Humongous company, Infogrames transitioned all assets and brands to a newly established company, Humongous, Inc. In April 2008, Infogrames would purchase and merge with Atari, Inc. Following this merger, Infogrames Entertainment's company name was changed to Atari SA, who would go on to publish numerous more Backyard Sports titles.

In March 2008, Humongous signed a deal with Interactive Game Group, LLC., who then signed a US publishing deal with Majesco Entertainment to publish Wii ports of several Humongous titles. A similar publishing deal with Atari Europe was also put into place. Mistic Software developed ports of the first installments of each Junior Adventure series, except Putt-Putt, taking advantage of the Wii Remote's point-and-click functionality. However, their availability was greatly limited by a legal conflict concerning their development.

In 2009, facing financial difficulties, Atari SA sold off its international distribution arms to Bandai Namco Entertainment.

Asset sale, brand revival and modern ports (2013–present) 
Finding itself in a difficult financial situation, Infogrames (then renamed Atari, SA), filed bankruptcy for three of its American subsidiaries, Atari, Inc., Atari Interactive and Humongous, Inc. in 2013. As part of the resolution proceedings, the Humongous brand and most game assets were transferred to Tommo on July 19, 2013. Furthermore, the Backyard Sports series was acquired by The Evergreen Group, and MoonBase Commander by Rebellion Developments. Using the trademark, Tommo re-launched the Humongous.com website in January 2014, and, together with Night Dive Studios, went on to re-release several Humongous Entertainment titles under the Humongous Entertainment label into digital distribution channels such as Steam and port them to smartphones, between April 2014 and August 2015.

In 2019, Humongous announced plans to port Junior Adventure games once again to contemporary consoles. In early 2022, Humongous released Nintendo Switch ports of Putt-Putt Travels Through Time, Freddi Fish 3: The Case of the Stolen Conch Shell, Putt-Putt Saves the Zoo, Pajama Sam: No Need to Hide When It's Dark Outside, Pajama Sam 2: Thunder and Lightning Aren't so Frightening, and Spy Fox in "Dry Cereal". A physical compilation of these releases, titled "Humongous Classic Collection" will be released in 2023. On November 3, 2022, PlayStation 4 versions of these games were released on the PlayStation Store.

Games developed

Putt-Putt 

 Putt-Putt Joins the Parade (1992)
 Putt-Putt Goes to the Moon (1993)
 Putt-Putt's Fun Pack (1993)
 Putt-Putt and Fatty Bear's Activity Pack (1994)
 Putt-Putt Saves the Zoo (1995)
 Putt-Putt and Pep's Balloon-o-Rama (1996)
 Putt-Putt and Pep's Dog on a Stick (1996)
 Putt-Putt Travels Through Time (1997)
 Putt-Putt Enters the Race (1999)
 Putt-Putt's One-Stop Fun Shop (2000)
 Putt-Putt Joins the Circus (2000)
 Putt-Putt: Pep's Birthday Surprise (2003)

Freddi Fish 

 Freddi Fish and the Case of the Missing Kelp Seeds (1994)
 Freddi Fish 2: The Case of the Haunted Schoolhouse (1996)
 Freddi Fish and Luther's Maze Madness (1996)
 Freddi Fish and Luther's Water Worries (1996)
 Freddi Fish 3: The Case of the Stolen Conch Shell (1998)
 Freddi Fish 4: The Case of the Hogfish Rustlers of Briny Gulch (1999)
 Freddi Fish's One-Stop Fun Shop (2000)
 Freddi Fish 5: The Case of the Creature of Coral Cove (2001)

Pajama Sam 

 Pajama Sam: No Need to Hide When It's Dark Outside (1996)
 Pajama Sam's Sock Works (1997)
 Pajama Sam 2: Thunder and Lightning Aren't so Frightening (1998)
 Pajama Sam's Lost & Found (1998)
 Pajama Sam 3: You Are What You Eat from Your Head to Your Feet (2000)
 Pajama Sam's One-Stop Fun Shop (2000)
 Pajama Sam: Games to Play On Any Day (2001)
 Pajama Sam: Life Is Rough When You Lose Your Stuff! (2003)

Spy Fox 

 Spy Fox in "Dry Cereal" (1997)
 Spy Fox in "Cheese Chase" (1998)
 Spy Fox 2: "Some Assembly Required" (1999)
 Spy Fox in "Hold the Mustard" (1999)
 Spy Fox 3: "Operation Ozone" (2001)

Fatty Bear 
 Fatty Bear's Birthday Surprise (1993)
 Fatty Bear's Fun Pack (1993)
 Putt-Putt and Fatty Bear's Activity Pack (1994)

Blue's Clues 

 Blue's Birthday Adventure (1998)
 Blue's ABC Time Activities (1999)
 Blue's 123 Time Activities (1999)
 Blue's Treasure Hunt (1999)
 Blue's Reading Time Activities (2000)
 Blue's Clues: Blue's Art Time Activities (2000)

Big Thinkers 

 Big Thinkers Kindergarten (1997)
 Big Thinkers 1st Grade (1997)

Junior Field Trips 

 Let's Explore the Farm (1994)
 Let's Explore the Airport (1995)
 Let's Explore the Jungle (1995)

Backyard Sports 

 Backyard Baseball (1997)
 Backyard Soccer (1998)
 Backyard Football (1999)
 Backyard Basketball (2001)
 Backyard Hockey (2002)
 Backyard Skateboarding (2004)

Other 
 MoonBase Commander (2002)

References

External links 
 

Humongous Entertainment games
Educational software companies
Companies based in Bothell, Washington
Software companies based in Washington (state)
Video game companies established in 1992
Video game companies disestablished in 2006
Video game development companies
Defunct video game companies of the United States